K. Sudhir is an American economist, currently the James L. Frank '32 Professor of Private Enterprise and Management, Professor of Marketing & Director of the China India Insights Program at Yale School of Management.

References

Year of birth missing (living people)
Living people
Yale School of Management faculty
American economists
Cornell University alumni